John A. Fraley (born c. 1951) is a  former Republican member of the North Carolina House of Representatives. A business owner from Mooresville, North Carolina, he represented the 95th district (including constituents in Iredell County) from 2015 until 2021. Following his retirement from the House in 2021, Fraley was appointed to the University of North Carolina Board of Governors for a term ending in 2025.

Committee assignments

2019-2020 session
Appropriations (Vice Chair)
Appropriations - Education (Chair)
Education - Universities (Chair)
Education - K-12
Rules, Calendar, and Operations of the House
Transportation
Health

2017-2018 session
Appropriations (Vice Chair)
Appropriations - Education (Chair)
Education - Universities (Chair)
University Board of Governors Nominating (Chair)
Rules, Calendar, and Operations of the House
Transportation
Banking
Commerce and Job Development

2015-2016 session
Appropriations
Appropriations - Education
Banking (Vice Chair)
Commerce and Job Development (Vice Chair)
Education - Universities
Rules, Calendar, and Operations of the House
Transportation

Electoral history

2018

2016

2014

References

Living people
Year of birth missing (living people)
People from Statesville, North Carolina
People from Mooresville, North Carolina
University of North Carolina at Chapel Hill alumni
21st-century American politicians
Republican Party members of the North Carolina House of Representatives